Albany banksia refers to two shrubs endemic to southwestern Australia, named after the town of Albany.
Banksia coccinea
Banksia verticillata

References

Banksia taxa by common name